Clovoxamine (INN) (developmental code name DU-23811) is a drug that was discovered in the 1970s and was subsequently investigated as an antidepressant and anxiolytic agent but was never marketed. It acts as a serotonin-norepinephrine reuptake inhibitor (SNRI), with little affinity for the muscarinic acetylcholine, histamine, adrenergic, and serotonin receptors. The compound is structurally related to fluvoxamine.

References 

Amines
Antidepressants
Chloroarenes
Ethers
Ketoximes
Serotonin–norepinephrine reuptake inhibitors